Craugastor stuarti is a species of frog in the family Craugastoridae. It is found in the Pacific slopes of Guatemala and adjacent Chiapas, Mexico. It is threatened by habitat loss mainly caused by agriculture and logging.

References

stuarti
Amphibians of Guatemala
Amphibians of Mexico
Amphibians described in 1967
Taxa named by John Douglas Lynch
Taxonomy articles created by Polbot